Aidan Fitzgerald (born 1980) is an Irish Gaelic footballer who played as a right wing-forward for the Tipperary senior team.

Born in Fethard, County Tipperary, Fitzgerald first arrived on the inter-county scene at the age of nineteen when he first linked up with the Tipperary under-21 team before later joining the intermediate hurling side. He joined the senior football panel during the 2000 championship. Fitzgerald subsequently became a regular member of the starting fifteen and won one Tommy Murphy Cup medal.

At club level Fitzgerald is a one-time championship medallist with Fethard.

Fitzgerald retired from inter-county football following the conclusion of the 2009 championship.

Honours

Player

Moyle Rovers
 Tipperary Senior Football Championship (1): 2001

Tipperary
 Tommy Murphy Cup (1): 2005
 McGrath Cup (1): 2003

References

1980 births
Living people
Fethard Gaelic footballers
Fethard hurlers
Tipperary inter-county Gaelic footballers
Tipperary inter-county hurlers